Indian Wells may refer to:

Places
Indian Wells, Arizona, community within the Navajo Nation
Indian Wells, California, city in Riverside County
Indian Wells, Kern County, California, community in Kern County
Indian Wells (Kern County, California), a California Historical Landmark
Indian Wells, Imperial County, California, a former settlement, and stage station, in Imperial County
Indian Wells Valley, valley in the Mojave Desert of California

Others
Indian Wells Masters, annual tennis tournament held in Indian Wells, California